Coleothorpa mucorea is a species of case-bearing leaf beetles in the family Chrysomelidae. It has two subspecies. It is found in North America.

Subspecies
 C. mucorea mucorea (J. L. LeConte, 1858)
 C. mucorea schaefferi  (Clavareau in Jacoby and Clavareau, 1907)

References

Clytrini
Beetles of North America
Beetles described in 1858